Marguerita Lightfoot is a counseling psychologist known for her research in the field of preventive medicine, especially in regard to HIV prevention and advocacy for homeless youth. She is Professor of Medicine at the University of California, San Francisco School of Medicine and the Chief of the Division of Prevention Science. She serves on the National Academies of Sciences, Engineering, and Medicine Committee on Fostering Healthy Mental, Emotional, and Behavioral Development among Children and Youth.

Biography 
Lightfoot earner her doctorate in counseling psychology at the University of California, Los Angeles (UCLA). As a student, she received the Ann C. Rosenfield Distinguished Community Partnership Award in 2008.  As a new scientist, Lightfoot was a member of the APA Leadership Institute for Women in Psychology.

At the UCSF School of Medicine, Lightfoot serves as the Director of the Center for AIDS Prevention Studies and the UCSF Prevention Research Center. Her research on AIDS prevention has been funded through multiple grants from the National Institute of Mental Health. and the National Institute on Drug Abuse.

Awards 
Lightfoot received the American Psychological Association Award for Distinguished Early Career Contributions to Psychology in the Public Interest in 2012. Her award citation emphasized "her leadership, innovation, and commitment to applying psychological principles to develop behavioral health interventions for vulnerable populations, particularly homeless adolescents and racial/ethnic groups."

Representative publications 
 Lightfoot, M. (2012). HIV prevention for adolescents: Where do we go from here? American Psychologist , 67 (8), 661-671. https://doi.org/10.1037/a0029831
 Lightfoot, M., Comulada, W. S., & Stover, G. (2007). Computerized HIV preventive intervention for adolescents: Indications of efficacy. American Journal of Public Health , 97 (6), 1027-1030. https://doi.org/10.2105/AJPH.2005.072652
 Lightfoot, M., Rotheram-Borus, M. J., & Tevendale, H. (2007). An HIV-preventive intervention for youth living with HIV. Behavior Modification, 31 (3), 345–363. https://doi.org/10.1177/0145445506293787
 Lightfoot, M., Swendeman, D., Rotheram-Borus, M. J., Comulada, W. S., & Weiss, R. (2005). Risk behaviors of youth living with HIV: pre-and post-HAART. American Journal of Health Behavior , 29 (2), 162-172. https://doi.org/10.5993/AJHB.29.2.7
 Rotheram-Borus, M. J., Lightfoot, M., Moraes, A., Dopkins, S., & LaCour, J. (1998). Developmental, ethnic, and gender differences in ethnic identity among adolescents. Journal of Adolescent Research, 13 (4), 487–507.https://doi.org/10.1177/0743554898134006

References

External links 

 Faculty Homepage

American women psychologists
American clinical psychologists
African-American psychologists
University of California, San Francisco faculty
University of California, Los Angeles alumni
American Psychological Association
Living people
Year of birth missing (living people)
21st-century African-American people
21st-century African-American women